Grand General (initiated 2010 in Trondheim as Kenneth Kapstad  Group) are a Norwegian jazz-fusion band that consists of drummer Kenneth Kapstad (former member of Gåte and Motorpsycho), bassist Trond Frønes, keyboardist Erlend Slettevoll, guitarist Even Helte Hermansen, and violinist Ola Kvernberg.

Biography 

This is another heavy Norwegian fusion quintet becoming Grand General after premiering as the Kenneth Kapstad Group at the Trondheim Jazzfest in 2010. In addition to Kapstad, the band comprises bassist Trond Frønes, a fellow member of the metal band Goat The Head, and contemporary jazz musicians like violinist Ola Kvernberg, pianist Erlend Slettevoll and guitarist Even Helte Hermansen known from the jazz rock band Bushman's Revenge and also a collaborator on the jazz metal album Blackjazz by Shining among other collaborations. They released their debut self-titled album Grand General in February 2013, consisting of six tracks which could be interpreted as a modern, clearer and more metal approach on music made by Steve Morse of Dixie Dregs or Mahavishnu Orchestra for example.

Band members 
Ola Kvernberg - violin
Even Helte Hermansen - guitar
Erlend Slettevoll -  keyboard
Trond Frønes - bass
Kenneth Kapstad - drums

Discography 
2013: Grand General (Rune Grammofon)

References

External links
Kenneth Kapstad Official website
Ola Kvernberg Official website 

Norwegian post-rock groups
Norwegian jazz ensembles
Rune Grammofon artists
Musical groups established in 2010
2010 establishments in Norway
Musical groups from Trondheim
Jazz fusion ensembles
Jazz-rock groups